SS Corsea, a laden  William Cory & Son collier in convoy FS 32 on 11 November 1940, was damaged by a Junkers Ju 87 Stuka bomber. There were no casualties, and the ship reached the Thames safely. Two other colliers in the same convoy ( and ) were bombed by the same Luftwaffe group at the same time.

References

World War II merchant ships of the United Kingdom
Colliers
1921 ships
Merchant ships of Finland
Ships built on the River Wear
Maritime incidents in November 1940